Ilkka was a Finnish morning newspaper published in Seinäjoki, Finland from 1906 to 2020.

History and profile
Ilkka was established in Vaasa in 1906 as an independent newspaper. The name may be a reference to Jaakko Ilkka, a 16th-century rebellion leader in the Cudgel War, but this is unconfirmed. The founders of the paper were Santeri Alkio and his supporters. Later its headquarters in Vaasa was moved to Seinäjoki. Ilkka was part of the Ilkka Group which also owned Pohjalainen. The publisher was Ilkka-Yhtymä Oyj.

Ilkka later became a supporter of the Centre Party and remained as such until 1997 when it declared its independence.

The circulation of Ilkka was 55,395 copies in 2001. The paper sold 49,171 copies in 2013.

In September 2019 it was announced Ilkka and Pohjalainen would be merged into a single newspaper, known as Ilkka-Pohjalainen, starting from 30 January 2020.

Editors 
 1906–1930: Santeri Alkio 
 1930–1957: Artturi Leinonen 
 1957–1980: Veikko Pirilä 
 1980–2007: Kari Hokkanen 
 2008–2012: Matti Kalliokoski 
 2012–2019: Satu Takala

References

External links

1906 establishments in Finland
2020 disestablishments in Finland
Daily newspapers published in Finland
Defunct newspapers published in Finland
Finnish-language newspapers
Mass media in Vaasa
Mass media in Seinäjoki
Newspapers established in 1906
Publications disestablished in 2020